"The Birdbot of Ice-Catraz" is the fifth episode in the third season of Futurama. It originally aired on the Fox network in the United States on March 4, 2001. The episode was written by Dan Vebber and directed by James Purdum.  Phil Hendrie guest stars in the episode as Free Waterfall Sr.

Plot 
Professor Farnsworth gives the crew an "extremely controversial" mission: towing a dark matter tanker through the solar system, and dangerously near a penguin nature preserve on Pluto in order to avoid a tollbooth. Leela refuses to take part, so the Professor makes Bender the new captain. Leela joins the protesters from Penguins Unlimited.

After initially failing to stop the tanker, Leela and the protesters race ahead to intercept the tanker at Pluto.  Meanwhile, aboard the Planet Express ship, Bender lets his new power go to his head. Fry gets fed up with Bender's captaining, and rejects both his leadership and friendship. A distraught Bender goes on a sobriety binge, and takes the tanker on an erratic course over Pluto. The tanker collides with an iceberg, and spills dark matter across the landscape.

For his part in the disaster, Bender is sentenced to community service, cleaning up the spill alongside the Penguins Unlimited environmentalists.  However, when the police officers supervising his work are distracted by a round of friendly hugging, Bender dons a tuxedo and blends into the colony of penguins.

Leela sets off to search Pluto for Bender, while Fry inexplicably decides to take the Planet Express ship and search for Bender in space. That night, Bender is mauled by an orca, and the damage causes him to shut down.  When he reboots, his boot loader reinitializes him with penguin-like behaviors.

Back at the Penguins Unlimited facility, it is announced that the dark matter has dramatically increased the penguins' reproductive speed. Whereas one penguin usually lays one egg a year, the penguins (both males and females) are now laying eggs at a rate of six eggs every fifteen minutes, which go on to hatch in 12 hours. In order to save the penguins from mass starvation, penguin hunting season is declared. A reluctant Leela agrees to take part; but her first shot hits Bender in the head, causing him to reboot into his normal personality.

When the hunters arrive, Bender leads a large force of penguins in an assault. After the penguins succeed in driving off the hunters, Bender takes off his tuxedo.  Unfortunately, since he had taught the penguins to hate anything that was not a penguin ("If it ain't black and white, peck, scratch and bite"), he and Leela come under attack.  The penguins corner them on a floating slab of ice, but Fry arrives in the ship to save them.  When it lands on the ice, it tips the block, sending the penguins sliding into the gaping mouth of a hungry orca. Leela and Bender board the ship, and everyone returns to Earth. Leela reasons that nature will set things right. Two penguins pick up guns left behind by the hunters and cock them at each other in a threatening manner.

Continuity 
When Bender first reboots, he is initialized as "Penguin" because his display sees penguins. When Bender reboots later after being shot by Leela, he is initialized as "Human" because he sees Leela. This is another clue that Leela is a human mutant and not an alien (as is revealed in the season 4 episode, "Leela's Homeworld"). In season 7's "Forty Percent Leadbelly", as Dr. Beeler is browsing through Bender's file system, his Penguin Personality folder is shown next to his Main Personality folder.

Cultural references 
 The episode is a parody of the Exxon Valdez oil spill, with the dark matter tanker named the Juan Valdez; also referencing the Colombian coffee mascot.
 The fictional conservation agency depicted as Penguins Unlimited is a parody of the actual agency Ducks Unlimited, sharing the same criticism that the organization exists to merely fulfill the members' interest in hunting.
 The title of this episode is a reference to Robert Stroud, who was known as the Birdman of Alcatraz.
 Bender's speech to the penguins as they attack is a reference to Winston Churchill's famous "We shall fight on the beaches" speech.
The scene where the killer whale tips the slab of ice to eat the penguins is a reference to the final scene of the 1977 film Orca.
When Bender suffers an electric shock upon landing head-first on a slab of ice after being attacked by an orca, he whistles one of R2-D2’s signature beeps.
During his state of sobriety, Bender can be heard singing "Greenland Whale Fisheries".

Broadcast and reception 
In its original airing, the episode was number 75 for the week and received a 4.9 rating share. In 2006, the episode was ranked by IGN.com as number 22 in their list of the Top 25 Futurama episodes, noting Free Waterfall Sr. and the penguin overpopulation in particular as the funniest parts of the episode.

References

External links

The Birdbot of Ice-Catraz at The Infosphere.

Futurama (season 3) episodes
2001 American television episodes
Fiction set on Pluto